The Man Who Wouldn't Die may refer to:

The Man Who Wouldn't Die (1942 film), starring Lloyd Nolan
The Man Who Wouldn't Die (1995 film), a made-for-television movie featuring Roger Moore
"The Man Who Couldn't Die", an episode of the western television series The Virginian

See also
The Woman Who Wouldn't Die, an alternate title for the 1965 British film Catacombs